Paramount Institute of Technology and Management is an Institute of technology, teaching engineering and management in Gurgaon, India.

Courses

Engineering
 Aeronautical Engineering
 Mechanical Engineering
 Electronics & Telecommunication Engineering
 Computer Science and Engineering
 Information Technology

Management

 Bachelor of Computer Application (BCA)
 Bachelor of Business Administration (BBA)
 Master of Computer Application (MCA)
 Master of Business Administration (MBA)

External links

Engineering colleges in Haryana
Business schools in Haryana
Universities and colleges in Gurgaon